The lateral pterygoid nerve (or external pterygoid nerve) is a branch of the anterior division of the mandibular nerve. It usually originates as two separate branches that travel near the buccal nerve, and enter the deep surfaces of the superior and inferior heads of the lateral pterygoid muscle.

Nerve pathway 
 trigeminal nerve (CN V)
 mandibular nerve (V3)
 anterior division of mandibular nerve

Variation 
Some authors describe the lateral pterygoid nerve as a single branch of the anterior division of the mandibular nerve which then bifurcates to enter the two heads of the lateral pterygoid muscle.

References

Mandibular nerve